Alexander Cochrane was a Navy commander.

Alexander Cochrane may also refer to:
 Alex Cochrane (footballer) (born 2000), English footballer
 Sandy Cochrane (1900–1967), Scottish footballer

See also
Alexander Cochran (disambiguation)
Alexander Baillie-Cochrane, 1st Baron Lamington